Didi may refer to:

Arts and entertainment
 "Didi" (song), a song by Khaled
 Didi, the principal character in Didi's Comedy Show, a German comedy television show
 Didi Pickles, mother of Tommy and Dil in the cartoons Rugrats and All Grown Up!

People
 Didi (footballer, born 1928) (Waldyr Pereira, 1928–2001), Brazilian footballer
 Didi (footballer, born 1963) (Diedja Maglione Roque Barreto), Brazilian women's football goalkeeper
 Didi (footballer, born 1976) (Sebastião Pereira do Nascimento), Brazilian football striker
 Didi (footballer, born 1982) (Cleidimar Magalhães Silva), Brazilian football striker
 Didi (footballer, born 1985) (Didac Rodríguez González), Spanish football winger
 Didi (footballer, born 1991) (Vinicius José Ignácio), Brazilian football defender
 Didi (footballer, born 1994) (José Diogo Macedo da Silva), Portuguese football midfielder
 Didi (Angolan footballer), Angolan international player 1999–2001
 Renato Aragão (born 1935), Brazilian humorist also known as Didi
 Mamata Banerjee (born 1955), nicknamed Didi, chief minister of West Bengal, India
 Didi Benami (born 1986), American singer/songwriter
 Didi Carli, Argentinian ballet dancer
 Didi Conn (born 1951), American actress
 Didi Contractor (1929–2021), German-American architect
 Didi Gregorius (born 1990), Dutch baseball player
 Dietmar Hamann (born 1973), German footballer
 Dietmar Kühbauer (born 1971), Austrian footballer
 Didi Petet (1956–2015), Indonesian actor
 Diego Santos (born 1987), Brazilian footballer also known as Didi
 Didi Senft (born 1952), also known as "Didi the Devil", colorful spectator of cycle races
 Évelyne Didi, French actress
 Ibrahim Didi, Maldivian politician
 Marcos Louzada Silva (born 1999), Brazilian basketball player also known as Didi

Other uses
 DiDi, a Chinese vehicle for hire company 
 Didi, Iran, a village in Kerman Province, Iran
 Vladimir (Waiting for Godot), nicknamed Didi, a character in Samuel Beckett's play

See also
 Dee Dee (disambiguation)
 DD (disambiguation)
 Diddy (disambiguation)

Lists of people by nickname